Cineni is a village in Gwoza, Borno State, Nigeria. It is the home of the Cineni language.

References

Populated places in Borno State